Huesca–Pirineos Airport
, also known as Huesca Airport, is the airport serving the province of Huesca in Spain.

The airport is intended to serve skiing resorts in the Aragonese Pyrenees, but the closest ski station is more than 100 kilometers away.

In 2013, 279 passengers passed through the airport, a decrease of 79.2% from 2012. Aircraft movements fell by 33.1% to 1,637.

Data for 2016 indicated that passenger usage had fallen to a total of 95 for the year (49 arrivals and 46 departures), making Huesca-Pirineos the airport with the least passenger traffic in the AENA network. However, by 2018 passenger numbers had improved, as in that year the airport handled 1,473 passengers and 9,477 flight operations

Airlines and destinations
In February 2011, Pyrenair ceased activities, leaving the airport without any commercial activity until Air Europa commenced a seasonal service to Menorca which since also ceased. As of January 2014 there are no scheduled services to and from Huesca. There are no airlines or destinations.

Statistics

References

External links

 Huesca Airport official website

Airports in Aragon
Buildings and structures in the Province of Huesca